Woodbridge station may refer to:

Woodbridge station (Virginia), an Amtrak and Virginia Railway Express station in Woodbridge, Virginia
Woodbridge station (NJ Transit), a former Pennsylvania Railroad station on the North Jersey Coast Line in Woodbridge, New Jersey
Woodbridge railway station, a station on the British National Rail East Suffolk Line in Woodbridge, Suffolk, England
Woodbridge railway station, Perth, a station on the Midland Line in Western Australia